José Manouel da Conceicao (1822–1873) was a former Catholic priest, later converted to the Reformed faith and joined the Presbyterian Church of Brazil and become the first Brazilian pastor of this evangelical denomination. His ordination was on December 17, 1865. He served as an evangelist in Sao Paulo. Because of his conversion to the Reformed faith Conceicao had been excommunicated from the Roman Catholic church. He was often injured in his travels, and died in Vale do Paraíba due to the injuries sustained.

His convert 
He was born in March 1822 in sao Paulo. Later in 1844 and 1845 he was ordained as a deacon in the Roman Church. Some works of Laemmert made him to doubt in the Catholic church. He attended a Protestant worship performed by Latimer Blackford, and later made friendship with Ashbel Green Simonton.

References

Brazilian Presbyterian missionaries
Presbyterian missionaries in Brazil
Converts to Presbyterianism
Converts to Calvinism from Roman Catholicism
19th-century Brazilian Roman Catholic priests
People excommunicated by the Catholic Church
1822 births
1873 deaths